Promont is a historic house in Milford, Ohio, United States, which was built in 1865 and listed on the National Register of Historic Places in 1980.  It was home to John M. Pattison, 43rd Governor of Ohio from 1879 until his death in 1906.

History

Promont was built in 1865 by William McGrue on a hill above the village of Milford, OH and the Little Miami River.  The Italianate Victorian home was purchased in 1879 by John M. Pattison, 43rd Governor of Ohio.

Promont served as the Governor's residence during Pattison's term in office.  Pattison suffered from Bright's disease and was so weakened by the disease that after his inauguration on January 8, 1906, he was too ill to remain in the state capital.  He returned home to Promont that day.  He never returned to Columbus.  Pattison directed the state government from Promont until his death on June 18, 1906.

Promont remained a private residence until 1983 when it was donated by James Kirgan to the Greater Milford Area Historical Society.  Promont was placed on the National Register of Historic Places on November 21, 1980.

Promont Today

Today, Promont operates as a historic house museum.  The home is furnished in Victorian style and is open to the public for tours.  It also houses exhibits of local history and a historical library of local reference information.

References

External links
 Promont House Museum - Greater Milford Area Historical Society

Houses on the National Register of Historic Places in Ohio
Museums in Clermont County, Ohio
National Register of Historic Places in Clermont County, Ohio
Historic house museums in Ohio
Houses in Clermont County, Ohio
Houses completed in 1865
1865 establishments in Ohio